Saint-Théodore-d’Acton (Saint Theodore of Acton) is a municipality in the Regional County Municipality of Acton, in the province of Quebec, Canada. The population as of the Canada 2011 Census was 1,471.

Within this municipality there is a small village, with the same name.  In terms of legal jurisdiction the village is part of the larger municipality, and has no separate identity. Outside the one small village, the rest of the municipality is completely rural.

Demographics

Population
Population trend:

Language
Mother tongue language (2006)

See also
List of municipalities in Quebec

References

External links
Municipality of Saint-Théodore-d’Acton 
Regional County Municipality of Acton 
Profile of Saint-Théodore-d'Acton by Quebec government 
Industry Canada -  Community demographics

Municipalities in Quebec
Incorporated places in Acton Regional County Municipality